The Actinospicaceae are a family of bacteria.

References 

Actinomycetia